Major-General Henry Scott, 1st Earl of Deloraine KB (1676 – 25 December 1730) was a Scottish peer and army officer.

Life
Scott was the second surviving son of James Scott, 1st Duke of Monmouth (the illegitimate son of King Charles II by his mistress Lucy Walter) by his wife Anne Scott, 1st Duchess of Buccleuch, daughter of  Francis Scott, 2nd Earl of Buccleuch. In 1693, he married Anne Duncombe (d. 1720), a daughter of William Duncombe of Batthesden, Lord Chief Justice of Ireland. They had three surviving children:

Francis Scott, 2nd Earl of Deloraine (1710–39)
Henry Scott, 3rd Earl of Deloraine (1712–40)
Lady Anne Scott (c.1720–?), died unmarried.

In 1706 Queen Anne created Scott Earl of Deloraine. He was elected to the last Scottish Parliament that year and voted in favour of the Acts of Union. In 1725 he was vested with the Order of the Bath.  In 1727 he was appointed a Gentleman of the Bedchamber.

In 1726, Deloraine married Mary Howard, Countess of Deloraine, the granddaughter of Col. Philip Howard, and they had two daughters:

Lady Georgiana Caroline (1727–1809), married James Peachey, 1st Baron Selsey.
Lady Henrietta (b. 1728–?), married Nicolas Boyce.

Lord Deloraine died suddenly on Christmas Day in 1730 in Leadwell (now Ledwell), Oxfordshire, and is buried at Sandford St Martin, Oxfordshire. His second wife, who had been a royal mistress, remarried and she is buried at Windsor.

References

British Life Guards officers
Earls in the Peerage of Scotland
Knights Companion of the Order of the Bath
Scottish representative peers
Scott, Henry
1676 births
1730 deaths
H
Carabiniers (6th Dragoon Guards) officers
Bedfordshire and Hertfordshire Regiment officers
Freemasons of the Premier Grand Lodge of England
Peers of Scotland created by Queen Anne